Remind Me Where the Light Is is the second album from the U.S. band Great Northern, released on April 28, 2009, on Eenie Meenie Records.

Information
Wishing to expand their sound, Bixler and Stolte began working with producer Michael Patterson (Beck, Black Rebel Motorcycle Club, Beck, Puff Daddy, She Wants Revenge, amongst others) and Nic Jodoin.

Track listing

References

2009 albums
Great Northern (indie band) albums